Rubylith is a brand of masking film, invented and trademarked by the Ulano Corporation. Today the brand has become genericized to the point that it has become synonymous with all coloured masking films.

Rubylith consists of two films sandwiched together. The bottom layer is a clear polyester backing sheet; the top layer is a translucent, red-(ruby-)coloured, sheet. The top layer can be cut and peeled away from the bottom layer.  The top layer's colour is light-safe for orthochromatic films (which are sensitive to blue and green light but insensitive to red light).

Rubylith is used in many areas of graphic design, typically to produce masks for various printing techniques. For example it is often used to mask off areas of a design when using a photoresist to produce printing plates for offset lithography or gravure. It is also frequently used during screen-printing.

Ulano also produces a yellow coloured, masking film called Amberlith, that is light safe only for blue-sensitive emulsions.

VLSI production 

Rubylith was used in the early days of semiconductors and integrated circuits manufacturing as stencils to make photomasks (reticles). The physical layouts of the first generations of Intel microprocessors were first hand drawn on graph paper. A technician would then use a coordinatograph to precisely cut the rubylith (lamenated onto a transparent plastic such as mylar) and a knife (X-Acto) to peel the appropriate sections away while it was resting on the light table.  The finished Rubylith mechanical masters were then photo reduced (onto a photographic film) up to 100 times and then step and repeated on to glass plates for production use. Usually, several such masks were made that were then used layer by layer.

Shortly after the 8008, Intel started using Calma's computer-aided design system that ran on a Data General minicomputer; the output masters may have stayed rubylith for a time, but other output options became available. Bell Telephone Laboratories, for example, had a high-resolution photoplotter. The integrated circuit industry left rubylith for better technologies.

Certain digital image editing programs that have masking features may use a red overlay to designate masked areas, mimicking the use of actual Rubylith film.

Manufacturing 

Intel
 For about ten years since 1968 engineers at Intel used manually drawn rubylith schematics to produce its first line of products: SRAM, DRAM, and EPROM memory; notable chips produced by using rubylith include:
 Intel 3101, first Intel product, a SRAM device
 Intel 4004
Intel 8008 (née 1201)
Intel 8080
Intel 8085
Intel 8086
Zilog
Z80
MOS Technology
MOS 6502 (layout by Bill Mensch)

Notes

See also 

 Now the Chips Are Down

References

External links

Graphic design